Hedy Kaufmann-Schlunegger (10 March 1923 – 3 July 2003) was a Swiss alpine skier. At the 1948 Winter Olympics, Hedy Schlunegger was the first Olympic Gold medalist in Lady's Downhill skiing.

After her success in skiing, Hedy Kaufmann-Schlunegger and her husband managed a sporting goods store in Grindelwald. Olympic medalist Martina Schild is her granddaughter.

References 
 Skiclub Wengen: Hedy Schlunegger 
 Kaufmann Sport Grindelwald: Geschichte 
 Jungfrau-Zeitung: Unsere Verstorbenen: Hedwig Kaufmann-Schlunegger 
 

1923 births
2003 deaths
Swiss female alpine skiers
Olympic alpine skiers of Switzerland
Olympic medalists in alpine skiing
Medalists at the 1948 Winter Olympics
Alpine skiers at the 1948 Winter Olympics

Olympic gold medalists for Switzerland
20th-century Swiss women